The divisions of Sindh,, are the first-order administrative bodies of the Sindh Province of Pakistan. In total, there are 7 divisions, which are further divided into districts depending upon area. Divisions are governed by Commissioners while districts are governed by Deputy Commissioners.

History
Administrative divisions had formed an integral tier of government from colonial times. The Governor's provinces of British India were subdivided into divisions, which were themselves subdivided into districts. 

On 1st April 1936 Sind division separated from Bombay Presidency and established a Province.

Most of the former Sind Province became Hyderabad Division.

In 1955, the One Unit policy meant that there were only two provinces – East and West Pakistan. East Pakistan had the same divisions as East Bengal had previously, but West Pakistan gradually gained seven new divisions to add to the original six. The princely state of Khairpur and some parts of Hyderabad Division to form Khairpur Division. When West Pakistan was dissolved, the divisions were regrouped into four new provinces. 

Gradually over the late 1970s, new divisions were formed.

In 1975  the Khairpur Division was abolished and create Sukkur Division and Divisional Headquarters also shifted from khairpur to Sukkur.Larkana Division also created by bifurcation of Sukkur Division. 

1990 Mirpurkhas Division were split from Hyderabad Division.

In August 2000, local government reforms abolished the "Division" as an administrative tier and introduced a system of local government councils, with the first elections held in 2001. Following that there was radical restructuring of the local government system to implement "the principle of subsidiarity, whereby all functions that can be effectively performed at the local level are transferred to that level". This meant devolution of many functions, to districts and tehsils, which were previously handled at the provincial and divisional levels. At abolition, there were five divisions in Sindh. 

In 2008, after the public elections, the new government decided to restore the divisions of all provinces.

In Sindh after the lapse of the Local Governments Bodies term in 2010 the Divisional Commissioners system was to be restored.

In July 2011, the Govt. of Sindh decided to restore the commissioner system  in the province. As a consequence, the five divisions of Sindh have been restored, namely, Karachi, Hyderabad, Sukkur, Mirpurkhas, and Larkana with their respective districts. As mentioned earlier, two new divisions were added in Sindh i.e. Bhanbore and Shaheed Benazirabad divisions.

Karachi district has been de-merged into its 5 original constituent districts, namely, Karachi East, Karachi West, Karachi Central, Karachi South, and Malir. Recently, Korangi District and Kemari District were carved out of the original 5 districts of Karachi. These seven districts form the Karachi Division now.

Administration

Every division of Sindh is divided into many districts and then further into talukas and union councils. Each division is administrated by a commissioner, assisted by different deputy commissioners of all districts of their division.

List of divisions

References

S